Laci or LACI may refer to:


People

Given name 
 Laci Boldemann (1921–1969), Swedish composer of German and Finnish descent
 Laci Endresz, (born 1974), English circus performer who performs as Mooky the Clown
 Laci Mosley, American actress, comedian, and podcaster
 Laci Peterson, a 2002 murder victim
 Laci Scott (born 1987), American beauty queen, 2005 Miss Oklahoma USA

Nickname 
 László Babai (born 1950), Hungarian professor of computer science and mathematics
 László Várkonyi (1909–1972), Hungarian table tennis player

Surname 
 Mergim Laci (born 2 April 1998) is a Swedish footballer
 Qazim Laçi (born 1996), Albanian footballer
 Vasil Laçi (1922–1941), Albanian would-be assassin of King Victor Emmanuel III of Italy and Albanian Prime Minister Shefqet Bej Vërlaci after the Italian occupation of Albania
 Žiga Laci (born 2002), Slovenian footballer
 de Laci, the surname of an old Norman noble family

Acronym 
 Lac repressor (LacI), a DNA-binding protein
 Lacunar stroke or lacunar cerebral infarct (LACI), a type of stroke
 LA Cleantech Incubator (LACI), Los Angeles's official cleantech business incubator

Other uses 
 Laçi, a city in northwestern Albania
 KF Laçi, a football club based in the city

See also 
 Lace (disambiguation)
 Lacy (disambiguation)

Hypocorisms
Lists of people by nickname